Receptor-interacting serine/threonine-protein kinase 1 (RIPK1) functions in a variety of cellular pathways related to both cell survival and death. In terms of cell death, RIPK1 plays a role in apoptosis and necroptosis. Some of the cell survival pathways RIPK1 participates in include NF-κB, Akt, and JNK.

RIPK1 is an enzyme that in humans is encoded by the RIPK1 gene, which is located on chromosome 6. This protein belongs to the Receptor Interacting Protein (RIP) kinases family, which consists of 7 members, RIPK1 being the first member of the family.

Structure 

RIPK1 protein is composed of 671 amino acids, and has a molecular weight of about 76 kDa. It contains a serine/threonine kinase domain (KD) in the 300 aa N-Terminus, a death domain (DD) in the 112 aa C-Terminus, and a central region between the KD and DD called intermediate domain (ID). 
The kinase domain plays different roles in cell survival and is important in necroptosis induction. RIP interacts with TRAF2 via the kinase domain. The KD can also interact with Necrostatin-1, which is an allosteric inhibitor of RIPK1 kinase activity. Overexpression of RIP lacking kinase activity can activate NF-kB.  
The death domain is homologous to the DD of other receptors such as Fas, TRAILR2 (DR5), TNFR1 and TRAILR1 (DR4), so it can bind to these receptors, as well as TRADD and FADD in the TNFR1 signalling complex. Overexpression of RIP can induce apoptosis and can activate NF-kB, but overexpression of the RIP death domain can block NF-kB activation by TNF-R1. 
The intermediate domain is important for NF-kB activation and (RHIM)-dependent signalling. Via the intermediate domain, RIP can interact with TRAF2, NEMO, RIPK3, ZBP1, OPTN and other small molecules and proteins, depending on cellular context.
.

Function 

Although, RIPK1 has been primarily studied in the context of TNFR signaling, RIPK1 is also activated in response to diverse stimuli.

The kinase domain, while important for necroptotic (programmed necrotic) functions, appears dispensable for pro-survival roles. Kinase activity of RIPK1 is also required for RIPK1-dependent apoptosis in conditions of IAP1/2 depletion, TAK1inhibition/depletion, RIPK3 depletion or MLKL depletion. Also, proteolytic processing of RIPk1, through both caspase-dependent and -independent mechanisms, triggers lethality that is dependent on the generation of one or more specific C-terminal cleavage product(s) of RIPk1 upon stress.

Role in cell survival 
It has been shown that cell survival can be regulated through different RIPK1-mediated pathways that ultimately result in the expression of NF-kB, a protein complex known to regulate transcription of DNA and thus, related to survival processes.

Receptor-mediated signalling 

The best well-known pathway of NF-kB activation is that mediated by the death receptor TNFR1, which starts as in the necroptosis pathway with the assembly of TRADD, RIPK1, TRAF2 and clAP1 in the lipid rafts of the plasma membrane (complex I is formed). In survival signalling, RIPK1 is then polyubiquitinated, allowing NEMO (Necrosis Factor – kappa – B essential modulator) to bind to the IkB kinase or IKK complex. To activate IKK, TAB2 and TAB3 adaptor proteins recruit TAK1 or MEKK3, which phosphorylate the complex. This results in the phosphorylation of the NF-kB inhibitors by the activated IKK complex, which in turn triggers their polyubiquitination and posterior degradation in the 26S proteasome.

As a result, NF-kB can now migrate to the nucleus where it will control DNA transcription by binding itself to the promoters of specific genes. Some of those genes are thought to have anti-apoptotic properties as well as to promote proteasomal degradation of RIPK1, resulting in a self-regulatory cycle.

While being in complex I, RIPK1 has also been proved to play a role in the activation of MAP (mitogen-activated protein) kinases such as JNK, ERK and p38. In particular, JNK can be found in both cell death and survival pathways, with its role in the cell death process being suppressed by activated NF-kB.

Cell survival signalling can also be mediated by TLR-3 (toll-like receptors) and TLR-4. In here, RIPK1 is recruited to the receptors where it is phosphorylated and polyubiquitinated. This results in the recruit of the IKK complex activating proteins (TAK1, TAB1 and TAB2) so eventually NF-kB can now too migrate to the nucleus. 
RIPK2 is involved in this TLR-mediated signalling, which suggests that there might be a regulation of cell survival or death (the two possible outcomes) through the mutual interaction between the two RIPK family members.

Genotoxic stress-mediated activation 
Upon DNA damage, RIPK1 mediates another NF-kB activation pathway where two simultaneous and exclusive processes occur. A pro-apoptotic complex is created while RIPK1 also mediates the interaction between PIDD, NEMO and IKK subunits that will eventually result in the IKK complex activation after interaction with ATM kinase (a DNA double-strand breaks stimulated protein). The interaction between RIPK1 and PIDD through their death domains is thought to promote cell survival to neutralize this pro-apoptotic complex.

Others 
It has been observed that RIPK1 may also interact with IGF-1R (insulin-like growth factor 1 receptor) to activate JNK (c-Jun N-terminal Kinases), it may be related to epidermal growth factor receptor signalling and it is largely expressed in glioblastoma cells, suggesting that RIPK1 is indeed involved in cell survival and proliferation processes.

Role in cell death

Necroptosis 
Necroptosis is a programmed form of necrosis which starts with the assembly of the TNF (tumor necrosis factor) ligand to its membrane receptor, the TNFR (tumor necrosis factor receptor). Once activated, the intracellular domain of TNFR starts the recruitment of the adaptor TNFR-1-associated death domain protein TRADD, which recruits RIPK1 and two ubiquitin ligases: TRAF2 and clAP1. This complex is called the TNFR-1 complex I.

Complex-I is then modified by the IAPs (Inhibitor of Apoptosis Proteins) and the LUBAC (Linear Ubiquitination Assembly Complex), which generate linear ubiquitin linkages. The ubiquitination of complex-I leads to the activation of NF-κB , which in turn activates the expression of FLICE-like inhibitory protein FLIP. FLIP then binds to caspase-8, forming a caspase-8 FLIP heterodimer in the cytosol that disrupts the activity of caspase-8 and prevents caspase-8 mediated apoptosis from taking place.

The assembly of complex II-b then starts in the cytosol. This new complex contains the caspase-8 FLIP heterodimer as well as RIPK1 and RIPK3. Caspase inhibition within this complex allows RIPK1 and RIPK3 to autotransphosphorylate each other, forming another complex called the necrosome. The necrosome starts recruiting MLKL (Mixed Lineage Kinase Domain Like protein), which is phosphorylated by RIPK3 and immediately translocates to lipid rafts inside the plasma membrane. This leads to the formation of pores in the membrane, allowing the sodium influx to increase -and consequently the osmotic pressure-, which eventually causes cell membrane rupture.

Apoptosis 
The apoptotic extrinsic pathway starts with the formation of the TNFR-1 complex-I, which contains TRADD, RIPK1, and two ubiquitin ligases:TRAF2 and clAP1.

Unlike the necroptotic pathway, this pathway doesn’t include the inhibition of caspase-8. Thus, in absence of NF-κB  function, FLIP is not produced, and therefore active caspase-8 assembles with FADD, RIPK1 and RIPK3 in the cytosol, forming what is known as complex IIa.

Caspase-8 activates Bid, a protein that binds to the mitochondrial membrane, allowing the release of intermembrane mitochondrial molecules such as cytochrome c. Cytochrome c then assembles with Apaf 1 and ATP molecules, forming a complex called apoptosome. The activation of caspase 3 and 9 by the apoptosome starts a proteolitic cascade that eventually leads to the degradation of organelles and proteins, and the fragmentation of the DNA, inducing apoptotic cell death.

Neurodegenerative diseases

Alzheimer's disease 
Patients with Alzheimer's disease, a neurodegenerative disease characterized by a cognitive deterioration and a behavioural disorder, experience a chronic brain inflammation which leads to the atrophy of several brain regions.

A sign of this inflammation is an increased number of microglia, a type of glial cells located in the brain and the spinal cord. RIPK1 is known to appear in larger quantities in brains from those affected with AD. This enzyme regulates not only necroptosis, but cell inflammation as well, and as a result it is involved in the regulation of microglial functions, specially those associated with the appearance and development of neurodegenerative diseases such as AD.

Amyotrophic Lateral Sclerosis 
Amyotrophic Lateral Sclerosis (ALS) is characterized by the degeneration of motor neurons which leads to the progressive loss of mobility. Consequently, patients are unable to do any physical activity due to the atrophy of their muscles.

The optineurin gene (OPTN) and its mutation are known to be involved in ALS. When the organism loses OPTN, the dysmyelination of axons and its degeneration start. The degeneration of the axons is produced by several components from the Central Nervous System (CNS) including RIPK1 and another enzyme from the Receptor Interacting Protein kinases family, RIPK3, as well as other proteins such as MLKL.

Once RIPK1, RIPK3 and MLKL have contributed to the dysmyelination and the consequent degeneration of axons, the nerve impulse can't to go from one neuron to another due to the lack of myelin, which leads to the consequent mobility problems as the nerve impulse does not arrive to its final destination.

Autoinflamatory disease

An autoinflammatory disease characterised by recurrent fevers and lymphadenopathy  has been associated with mutations in this gene.

CRIA syndrome (Cleavage-resistant RIPK1-induced autoinflammatory syndrome) is a disorder caused by specific mutations of the  RIPK1 gene.  Symptoms include "fevers, swollen lymph nodes, severe abdominal pain, gastrointestinal problems, headaches and, in some cases, abnormally enlarged spleen and liver".

Interactions 
RIPK1 has been shown to interact with:

 BIRC2,
 BIRC3,
 CA11,
 CASP8,
 CFLAR,
 CRADD,
 RIPK2,
 RIPK3,
 RNF11,
 RNF216, 
 SQSTM1,
 TNFRSF1A,
 TRADD,
 TRAF2, 
 UBC.
 clAP1
 IAPs
 LUBAC
 IGF-1R
 FLIP
 MLKL

References

Further reading

External links